Jake William Trevor Taylor (born 1 December 1991) is a professional footballer who plays as a midfielder for  club Stevenage. Born in England, he has represented Wales internationally.

Club career

Reading 
Taylor joined Reading at the age of eight. Having scored 20 goals for the club's academy and under-18 sides during the 2009–10 season, he was handed his debut for the Royals in a League Cup game against Northampton Town at the Madejski Stadium on 24 August 2010, which ended in a 3–3 draw, with Northampton winning on penalties. He came on as a second-half substitute for Julian Kelly. He made his Football League debut on 9 May 2011 as a second-half substitute for Michail Antonio in the home game against Derby County.

Aldershot Town 
On 28 July 2011, it was agreed that Taylor would go on a one-month loan to Aldershot Town, to take effect from 1 August.

Exeter City 
On 21 September 2011, Taylor was loaned to Exeter City on a one-month loan which was subsequently renewed on a monthly basis until the end of the season.

Cheltenham Town 
On 22 November 2012, Taylor joined Reading teammate Lawson D'Ath on loan at Cheltenham Town until 2 January 2013. He made his Cheltenham debut in a 1–0 win over Barnet on 24 November and scored his first goal for the club on 27 December in the win over Wycombe Wanderers. Taylor appeared regularly on the left wing during his initial stay at the club and on 4 January 2013 his loan was extended for another month.

He was recalled by Reading on 28 January, having started just one of Cheltenham's four matches since his loan was extended.

Crawley Town 
The following month Taylor joined League One side Crawley Town on an initial one-month loan. He made his debut in the 2–0 win over Bury on 2 March playing in a central midfield role and made a further three appearances before returning to Reading at the end of March.

Return to Reading 
On 5 October 2013, Taylor made his first Reading appearance for nearly two-and-a-half years as a second-half substitute in a 2–1 defeat to Burnley. After his return to the side, Taylor was selected in several match day squads, including the defeats to Leicester City and Middlesbrough, though he remained an unused substitute in both games.

In May 2014 Taylor signed a new two-year contract with the option of a third. That season he scored his first goal for Reading in a 1–0 win over Ipswich. Taylor then went on to score the winner in the League Cup in a 1–0 victory over Scunthorpe.

Leyton Orient 
On 26 March 2015, Taylor joined League One side Leyton Orient on loan for the remainder of the 2014–15 season.

Motherwell 
On 11 August 2015, Taylor joined Scottish Premiership side Motherwell on loan for the remainder of the 2015–16 season. Taylor made 8 appearances for Motherwell before being recalled by Reading in January 2016.

Exeter City 
On 25 January 2016, Taylor joined League Two side Exeter City on a free transfer. He served as club captain between 2018 and 2021. On 12 May 2021, Taylor announced his intention to leave Exeter.

Stevenage
Taylor signed for fellow League Two club Stevenage on 21 May 2021.

International career 
Born in England, Taylor is eligible to play for Wales through his grandfather who was born in Barry.

Taylor has represented Wales at under-17 and under-19 level. On 18 May 2010, Taylor made his debut for the Wales under-21 side in a 1–0 defeat to Austria. In his last game for the under-21s, he captained the side against the Czech Republic in a 5–0 defeat.

In September 2014 Taylor was called up to the senior Wales squad for a match against Andorra. Taylor made his senior debut as an 84th-minute substitute for match winner Hal Robson-Kanu in a 2–1 European qualification victory against Cyprus on 13 October 2014.

Career statistics

Club

International

References

External links 
 
 Profile at the Exeter City F.C. website (archived)

1991 births
Living people
People from Ascot, Berkshire
English footballers
Welsh footballers
Wales youth international footballers
Wales under-21 international footballers
Wales international footballers
English people of Welsh descent
Association football midfielders
Reading F.C. players
Aldershot Town F.C. players
Exeter City F.C. players
Cheltenham Town F.C. players
Crawley Town F.C. players
Leyton Orient F.C. players
Stevenage F.C. players
English Football League players
Motherwell F.C. players
Scottish Professional Football League players